Robert Hylton Madge (born 2 April 1952) is a British entrepreneur and technologist.

Career
In the 1980s, he founded and was chairman of Madge Networks,  a pioneer of high speed networking technology.

Once he was the President of IDTrack,  a European Association for identification and traceability of goods based on technologies such as RFID. He was also the founder of Olzet, a provider of services associated with the implementation of RFID solutions in the food industry. 

He was President of the European Association for Secure Identification.

References

1952 births
Living people
British technology company founders
People in information technology
Radio-frequency identification